Stathis Kefallonitis FRSA, FRAeS, FCIM (born 1977) is a Greek American consumer engagement strategist, neuroscientist and professor at Embry–Riddle Aeronautical University, with particular interest in the air transport industry. He is a board member of the International Flight Services Association (IFSA).

Awards 
 Fellow of the Royal Society for the Encouragement of Arts, Manufacturers & Commerce (FRSA)
 Fellow of the Royal Aeronautical Society (FRAeS)
 Fellow Chartered Institute of Marketing (FCIM)

References

External links
 

Living people
1977 births
State University of New York at Oswego faculty
American scientists
American writers
American male writers
American writers of Greek descent
Alumni of Goldsmiths, University of London
Cornell University alumni